Climax is a city in Greenwood County, Kansas, United States.  As of the 2020 census, the population of the city was 45.

History
Climax was founded in 1884. It was named from its elevation, or Climax College in Kalamazoo, Michigan.

Geography
Climax is located at  (37.720155, -96.223888).

Demographics

2010 census
As of the census of 2010, there were 72 people, 28 households, and 23 families residing in the city. The racial makeup of the city was 98.6% White and 1.4% from two or more races.

There were 28 households, of which 28.6% had children under the age of 18 living with them, 71.4% were married couples living together, 3.6% had a female householder with no husband present, 7.1% had a male householder with no wife present, and 17.9% were non-families. 14.3% of all households were made up of individuals, and 10.7% had someone living alone who was 65 years of age or older. The average household size was 2.57 and the average family size was 2.87.

The median age in the city was 48.5 years. 25% of residents were under the age of 18; 0.1% were between the ages of 18 and 24; 19.5% were from 25 to 44; 23.6% were from 45 to 64; and 31.9% were 65 years of age or older. The gender makeup of the city was 47.2% male and 52.8% female.

2000 census
As of the census of 2000, there were 64 people, 24 households, and 18 families residing in the city. The racial makeup of the city was 85.94% White, 12.50% from other races, and 1.56% from two or more races. Hispanic or Latino of any race were 15.62% of the population.

There were 24 households, out of which 33.3% had children under the age of 18 living with them, 66.7% were married couples living together, 4.2% had a female householder with no husband present, and 25.0% were non-families. 25.0% of all households were made up of individuals, and 8.3% had someone living alone who was 65 years of age or older. The average household size was 2.67 and the average family size was 3.17.

In the city, the population was spread out, with 31.3% under the age of 18, 6.3% from 18 to 24, 21.9% from 25 to 44, 31.3% from 45 to 64, and 9.4% who were 65 years of age or older. The median age was 36 years. For every 100 females, there were 113.3 males. For every 100 females age 18 and over, there were 120.0 males.

The median income for a household in the city was $34,375, and the median income for a family was $40,625. Males had a median income of $42,500 versus $14,375 for females. The per capita income for the city was $14,461. There were no families and 4.1% of the population living below the poverty line, including no under eighteens and 22.2% of those over 64.

Education
The community is served by Eureka USD 389 public school district.

Climax High School was closed through school unification. The Climax High School mascot was Bulldogs.

See also
 Fall River Lake and Fall River State Park

References

Further reading

External links
 Climax - Directory of Public Officials
 Climax city map, KDOT

Cities in Kansas
Cities in Greenwood County, Kansas